, also known by the Chinese-style name , was a politician and bureaucrat of Ryukyu Kingdom.

Kamegawa was selected as a member of the Sanshikan in 1871, but was forced to retire by Japan in the next year because he was strongly pro-Chinese. 

After Ryukyu was annexed by Japan in 1879, Kamegawa Seibu became the chief leader of anti-Japanese factions. He sent his grandson Kamegawa Seitō (also known as Mō Yūkei ) to Fuzhou to request China negotiate it with Japan. In the next year, Seitō came back to Shuri and spread rumors that Chinese troops would come to liberate Ryukyu soon. The Kamegawa family was arrested by police, and tortured in the prison. Seibu was released on 3 November, but died ten days later.

References
"Kamegawa Seibu." Okinawa konpakuto jiten (沖縄コンパクト事典, "Okinawa Compact Encyclopedia").

1808 births
1880 deaths
People of the Ryukyu Kingdom
Ryukyuan people
19th-century Ryukyuan people
Ueekata
Sanshikan